Hoseynabad-e Kordehha (also Romanized as Ḩoseynābād-e Kordehhā; also known as Ḩoseynābād-e Kordeh (Persian: حسين آباد کرده) and Ḩoseynābād-e Kordha) is a village in Hoseynabad-e Kordehha Rural District, in the Central District of Aradan County, Semnan Province, Iran. At the 2006 census, its population was 1,303, in 367 families.

References 

Populated places in Aradan County